Pork–cat syndrome is an allergy to pork, usually after adolescence, that is related to cat allergy. Although first described in 1994, it was first documented in the U.S. by Scott Commins and Thomas Platts-Mills during their research on alpha-gal allergy.

It is called "pork–cat syndrome" because it is a cross-reactivity where an allergy to cat serum albumin (protein made by a cat's liver) cross-reacts with pork albumin and "can lead to severe or even fatal allergic reactions on occasions when pork is consumed."

References 

Food allergies
Syndromes